Felix Hans Boehm (June 9, 1924, Basel – May 25, 2021, Altadena, California) was a Swiss-American experimental physicist, known for his research on weak interactions, parity violation, and neutrino physics.

Biography
He had four brothers and both his father and his paternal grandfather were in the publishing business. Felix Boehm completed his Matura in 1943 and was drafted into Swiss army, which allowed him to study physics part-time at the University of Geneva. In the autumn of 1943 he matriculated at ETH Zurich. There he took several classes from Wolfgang Pauli and graduated in physics with his Diplom in 1948 and his doctorate in 1951 with doctoral advisor Paul Scherrer. Boehm worked as an assistant to Scherrer from 1951 to March 1952 and then went as a Boese Fellow to Columbia University, where he studied with C. S. Wu for a year and a half. As a postdoctoral research fellow he went in July 1953 to Caltech, where he studied with Jesse DuMond and Charles Lauritsen. In 1957 Boehm married Ruth Sommerhalder, whom he met in 1956 at a social occasion at the Swiss consulate in Los Angeles. At Caltech he became in 1958 an assistant professor, in 1961 a full professor at Caltech, in 1985 William L. Valentine Professor of Physics, and in 1995 professor emeritus in retirement. In 1960 he played an essential role in bringing Rudolf Mössbauer to the California Institute of Technology. In 1961 Boehm was awarded a 2-year Sloan Research Fellowship.

He held visiting positions in 1957/58 at the University of Heidelberg (at the invitation of Jensen), 1965/66 at the University of Copenhagen, in 1971/72 at CERN, and in 1979/80 at the Institut Laue-Langevin in Grenoble, where he also worked with scientists from the Paul Scherrer Institute. He was a visiting professor in 1980 at the Ludwig Maximilian University of Munich and 1981 at ETH Zurich. (Years earlier he had turned down an offer of a professorship at ETH in favor of Caltech.)

In the 1950s Boehm worked on experiments on parity violation and experimentally confirmed the violation first reported by C. S. Wu. In 1956 Boehm and Aaldert Wapstra made the confirmation by measuring the circular polarization of gamma rays in beta decay. At Caltech Boehm came into contact with the theorists Richard Feynman and Murray Gell-Mann. Boehm did research on X-ray spectroscopy in nuclear physics, specifically, isotope shift of K-shell electrons and then experiments involving muons at CERN and at the Los Alamos Meson Physics Facility (LAMPF). He collaborated with French and Swiss scientists on neutrino detection with an experiment set up in the Gotthard Tunnel. For a number of years, he and his group also searched in vain for violations of time reversal invariance in nuclear physics (but found upper bounds for such violations). At Caltech he did research on double beta decay. In 1969 and 1970 he and J. C. Vanderleeden found parity non-conservation in nuclear forces by measuring the circular polarization of gamma rays from unpolarized atomic nuclei. Beginning in 1970 he collaborated extensively with the theorist Petr Vogel.

In 1980 Boehm received the Humboldt Research Award. In 1983 he was elected a member of the National Academy of Sciences.

In 1995 he received the Tom W. Bonner Prize in Nuclear Physics with citation:

In 2006 he was elected a Fellow of the American Association for the Advancement of Science.

Upon his death in 2021 he was survived by his widow and their two sons.

Selected publications

Articles

Books
  1st edition 1988

References

1924 births
2021 deaths
20th-century American physicists
20th-century Swiss physicists
ETH Zurich alumni
California Institute of Technology faculty
Scientists from Basel-Stadt
Experimental physicists
Nuclear physicists
Members of the United States National Academy of Sciences
Fellows of the American Association for the Advancement of Science
Swiss emigrants to the United States